This is an alphabetical list of villages in Tirunelveli district, Tamil Nadu, India.

A 

 Adaichani
 Ambalam
 Anaikulam
 Anaikutiyur
 Appankoil
 Arikesavanallur
 Ariyanayagipuram
 Athuvazhi
 Avaraikulam
 Avudaiyanoor

B-I 

 Brahmadesam
 Chempadu
 Deivaseyalpuram
 Dharugapuram
 Ittamozhi

K 

 Kadambankulam
 Kadanganeri
 Kadayam
 Kalangathakandy
 Kalathimadam
 Kalikumarapuram
 Kallikulam
 Kaluneerkulam
 Kandithankulam
 Keezha Thiruvenkatanathapuram
 Kizha Ambur
 Kizhanatham
 Kodaganallur
 Kootapuli
 Kothaiseri
 Kovankulam
 Kulakkattakurichi
 Kurumbalaperi
 Kurumbalapperi
 Kurumbapapperi
 Kuruvikulam
 Kuthenkully
 Kuthukalvalasai
 Kuttam

M 

 Mangudi
 Mannarkovil
 Mariathaipuram
 Maruthur
 Mathaganeri
 Mela Ilandaikulam
 Mela Thiruvenkatanathapuram
 Melapalayam
 Muthukrishnaperi
 Mylappapuram

O-R 

 Odaikkarai
 Odaimarichan
 Oormelalagiyan
 Pallakkal Pothukudi
 Pavanasapuram
 Pavoorchatram
 Perumal Nagar
 Poovankurichi
 Pudupatti
 Rengasamudram

S 

 Sambankulam
 Sathirakondan
 Seeniyapuram
 Sembikulam
 Singamparai
 Singampathu
 Singikulam
 Sivalarkulam
 Sivasailam
 Soundrapandiapuram
 Sri Renga Narayana Puram
 Subramaniapuram
 Suthamalli
 Suviseshapuram

T-V 

 Thachanallur
 Thambithoppu
 Thayar Thoppu
 Thenkalam
 Uthumalai
 Vellakulam
 Ventrilingapuram
 Veppilankulam

Tirunelveli district